is a Japanese freestyle wrestler. Matsunaga was born in Shizuoka. At the 2008 Summer Olympics in Beijing, he won silver in his category (55 kilograms).

Matsunaga has also competed in 2 SASUKE competitions (21-22), where he failed the Second Stage's Salmon Ladder and the First Stage's Jumping Spider respectively.

References 

Living people
Olympic wrestlers of Japan
Wrestlers at the 2008 Summer Olympics
Olympic silver medalists for Japan
1980 births
Nippon Sport Science University alumni
Olympic medalists in wrestling
Sasuke (TV series) contestants
Medalists at the 2008 Summer Olympics
Japanese male sport wrestlers
Sportspeople from Shizuoka Prefecture
21st-century Japanese people